The Latvian National Theatre is one of the leading professional theatres in Latvia. The building is in the Eclectic style and is an architectural and artistic monument. The country of Latvia was proclaimed in this building in the year 1918. On 23 February 2002, the theatre celebrated its 100th anniversary.  The director of National Theatre of Latvia since 2006 has been Ojārs Rubenis.

Mission 
The mission of Latvia's National Theatre is to be the centre of national culture and art with the goal of introducing the art of theatre and current events in culture, through national values, to an even larger part of society.

The National Theatre's vision for the future is to theatrically concentrate theatre's, art's and culture's most valuable pieces, by regularly introducing Latvian classics, original work, foreign theatre experience and current events to the viewer.

There are also plans to include the most interesting and the most talented professionals, continue the development of theatre as an art form, as well as strengthen the collaboration between theatres and other cultural organizations.

The guidelines for the National Theatre's development ensure the chance for the viewer to be introduced to all the events happening in the life of theatre in Latvia and with the most valuable foreign plays, as well as an opportunity to be a part of some of the best of the National Theatre's plays that are in the international circle.

Location 
The Latvian National Theatre is situated in the centre of Latvia's capital city Riga, on the bank of the Riga Canal. Located just outside the Old Town, it stands in a park where the Citadel used to be.

History 

In 1897 Riga’s city council decided that it was not enough to have just one theatre in Riga. Riga’s first theatre was the German Theatre, currently the Opera House. A competition was held to choose the design of the new building. The Augusts Reinbergs project "Dum spiro, spero" ("While I breathe, I hope") won and construction began, mainly funded by local Russian merchants and some nobility. The theatre was opened to the public on 14 September 1902 as Riga's Second (Russian) theatre (Rīgas 2. pilsētas (krievu) teātris) and held both theatre and opera performances. Although this was Russian language theatre, by 1917 Riga Latvian Society was renting the premises to hold plays in Latvian.

During the First World War the theatre was evacuated, but by 1918 it was already back in business, and on 15 October staged Richard Wagner's The Flying Dutchman. Just over a month later, Latvia declared its independence, with the declaration being read from the theatre's stage. The only remaining photograph from this historic event was taken in the theatre's main hall.

In 1919, during a brief period of Bolshevik rule, the makeshift government named it the Workers’ Theatre (Strādnieku teātris), but it became the Latvian National Theatre soon after and on 30 November the official opening took place with a staging of Rūdolfs Blaumanis "Ugunī" ("In Fire"). The creative program was authored by Jānis Akurāters, a Latvian writer, then head of the Art department of the Ministry of Education.

After the Soviet occupation of Latvia in 1940, the name of the theatre was deemed too nationalistic, so it was renamed to Riga's Dramatic Theatre (Rīgas Drāmas teātris), only to restore the previous name in 1988, 3 years before Latvia regained its independence.

The current managing director of the theatre is Ojārs Rubenis and the artistic director is Edmunds Freibergs

Layout 
The building is a combination of style; the facade has both eclectic and baroque features as well as elements of Art Nouveau, which was extremely popular in Riga at the time. The interior is very functional, but in the various ornaments, you can find elements of classicism. There are three halls in the theatre: the Great Hall (with 750 seats), the Actors Hall (with, depending on the play, 50–90 seats), and the LMT New Hall (with, depending on the play, 60–120 seats). Some seasons there is a fourth hall, "The Horror Bus", where a play by that name is held for children.

Actors 
There are 49 actors, 23 freelance actors and 17 directors in the group.

Theatre group 

 Ainārs Ančevskis        
 Kaspars Aniņš 
 Uldis Anže      
 Jānis Āmanis   
 Romāns Bargais          
 Marija Bērziņa            
 Dace Bonāte   
 Madara Bore   
 Madara Botmane        
 Mārtiņš Brūveris         
 Indra Burkovska         
 Raimonds Celms         
 Ilva Centere    
 Agnese Cīrule 
 Maija Doveika 
 Uldis Dumpis  
 Mārtiņš Egliens           
 Daiga Gaismiņa           
 Gundars Grasbergs      
 Juris Hiršs       
 Ģirts Jakovļevs            
 Zane Jančevska           
 Astrīda Kairiša            
 Daiga Kažociņa           
 Anna Klēvere  
 Ivars Kļavinskis          
 Arturs Krūzkops         
 Lāsma Kugrēna           
 Normunds Laizāns      
 Juris Lisners    
 Ģirts Liuziniks            
 Dita Lūriņa      
 Mārcis Maņjakovs       
 Egils Melbārdis           
 Inga Misāne-Grasberga
 Ivars Puga       
 Sanita Pušpure 
 Kārlis Reijers  
 LieneSebre     
 Uldis Siliņš      
 Jānis Skanis     
 Evija Skulte    
 Ināra Slucka    
 Jurģis Spulenieks        
 Igors Šelegovskis        
 Voldemārs Šoriņš        
 Jānis Vimba    
 Līga Zeļģe       
 Kaspars Zvīgulis

Freelance actors 

 Anta Aizupe    
 Zane Aļļēna     
 Lolita Cauka   
 Alise Danovska           
 Zane Dombrovska       
 Artis Drozdovs           
 Kaspars Dumburs       
 Rasma Garne  
 Baiba Indriksone         
 Juris Jope        
 Kristians Kareļins       
 Kārlis Krūmiņš            
 Ance Kukule   
 Kristaps Ķeselis          
 Līga Liepiņa    
 Marija Linarte 
 Zigurds Neimanis        
 Uldis Norenbergs        
 Ilze Rudolfa    
 Inta Tirole        
 Arno Upenieks            
 Māra Zemdega
 Ausma Ziemele

References

External links
Official website 

National theatres
1919 establishments in Latvia
Theatres in Riga
Theatres in Latvia
Independence of Latvia